David Denby was an author and a senior lecturer in French at Dublin City University. He retired in 2010.

Reception
Denby wrote Sentimental Narrative and the Social Order in France. The book was reviewed by Sean Quinlan in Eighteenth-Century Studies; he wrote that "Denby's analysis encompasses beautifully crafted readings of sentimental writers such as Baculard d'Arnaud, Jean-Claude Gorgy, François Vernes, Jean-Jacques Rousseau, idéologues Pierre Cabanis and Destutt de Tracy, and post-revolutionary thinkers such as Germaine de Staël." The work was also reviewed in Eighteenth-Century Fiction and in Modern Language Review.

Published works
Books by Denby include:
 Sentimental Narrative and the Social Order in France, 1760–1820, Cambridge University Press, 1994.
 (joint translator of): Jacques Le Goff et Pierre Nora, Faire de l'histoire, Paris, 1974; Constructing the Past, Cambridge, Cambridge University Press 
 (translator of) Alain Touraine et al., Solidarité, Paris, 1982: Solidarity, Cambridge, Cambridge University Press

Denby has also written a number of articles, conference proceedings, and book chapters.

References

External links
 Official Home Page
 Publication list

Living people
Year of birth missing (living people)
Academics of Dublin City University